Andrés Ducasse (born 24 June 1992) is a Chilean competitive sailor. He competed at the 2016 Summer Olympics in Rio de Janeiro, in the men's 470 class.

References

1992 births
Living people
Chilean people of French descent
Chilean male sailors (sport)
Olympic sailors of Chile
Sailors at the 2016 Summer Olympics – 470
Pan American Games medalists in sailing
Sailors at the 2015 Pan American Games
Pan American Games bronze medalists for Chile
Medalists at the 2015 Pan American Games